Kristjana Gunnars (born March 19, 1948 in Reykjavík) is an Icelandic-Canadian poet and novelist. She immigrated to Canada in 1969. Her works explore, among other themes, the 19th century Icelandic settler experience in Canada's prairie provinces.

Bibliography

Novels 
The Prowler (1989), winner of the McNally Robinson Book of the Year Award
The Substance of Forgetting (1992)
 Night Train to Nykobing (1998)

Short stories 
The Guest House and Other Stories (1992)
Any Day But This (2004)

Poetry 
One-eyed Moon Maps (1980)
Settlement Poems 1 (1980)
Settlement Poems 2 (1980)
Wake-pick Poems (1981)
The Axe's Edge (1983)
The Night Workers of Ragnorak (1985)
Exiles Among You (1996)
Carnival of Longing  (1989)
Silence of the Country (2002)
Night Train to Nykøbing (2002)

Non-fiction 
Zero Hour  (1991) 
The Rose Garden: Reading Marcel Proust (1996)
"Stranger at the Door " (2004)

Criticism 
 in German: Elisabeth Paleczek, Schreiben in einem anderen Land: Erinnerung, Gedächtnis und Identität in ausgewählten Werken Laura Goodman Salversons und Kristjana Gunnars'. AV Akademikerverlag, Riga 2013

References

External links
Kristjana Gunnars' entry in The Canadian Encyclopedia
 Gunnars at English-Canadian writers, Athabasca University, with 7 further weblinks; 2015

1948 births
Living people
20th-century Canadian novelists
20th-century Canadian poets
Canadian women poets
Icelandic emigrants to Canada
Canadian women novelists
Canadian people of Icelandic descent
20th-century Canadian women writers